Fire Chief is a magazine that was established in 1956. The magazine examines issues that are of particular importance to managers of fire departments.  It was published in Chicago by Penton Media until 2013; in 2014 it was sold to Praetorian Group.  The volumes for May 1968-Nov. 1991 were called also whole no. 134-415.

References

External links
 Fire Chief magazine

Online magazines published in the United States
Defunct magazines published in the United States
English-language magazines
Firefighting in the United States
Magazines established in 1956
Magazines disestablished in 2013
Online magazines with defunct print editions
Professional and trade magazines
Magazines published in Chicago